Teresa Rebull, née Teresa Soler i Pi (1919–2015), was a Catalan- Spanish nurse for the POUM who later became a singer. She was actively involved in the May Days events and punished for that. She later escaped Spain, where she could face danger from both Stalinists and Francoists, for France. In France she would join the Maquis after the Nazi invasion. After the war she became musically associated to Nova Cançó.

References 

POUM politicians
Women in war in Spain
Spanish nurses
Singers from Catalonia
1919 births
2015 deaths